Uszka or vushka  (Polish: Uszka, Ukrainian: Вушка, Belarusian: Вушкі) (meaning "little ears") are small dumplings (a very small and twisted version of pierogi) usually filled with flavoursome wild forest mushrooms and/or minced meat. They are usually served with barszcz, though they can be eaten simply with melted butter and herbs (usually chives) sprinkled over. When vegetarian (filled only with mushrooms or onion) they are a part of traditional Christmas Eve dishes in Poland and Ukraine, and are either added to the soup, or eaten as a side dish.

In various languages, they are called:
 
  (vúški)
  (vúška)

See also
 Pelmeni
 Pierogi
 Vareniki
 Kreplekh
 Maultasche

References

External links
 Recipe: Uszka
 Recipe: Vushka (Ukrainian Little Ear Dumplings)
  The original recipe for uszka

Polish cuisine
Ukrainian cuisine
Dumplings
Christmas food
Belarusian cuisine